The fourth USS Relief (ID-2170) was a salvage tug that served in the United States Navy from 1918 to 1919.

Relief was a steel-hulled wrecking tug built during 1907 by Harlan and Hollingsworth at Wilmington, Delaware.

The U.S. Navy acquired her on 8 August 1918 from the Merritt and Chapman Derrick and Wrecking Company of New York, New York for World War I service. The Navy gave her Id. No. 2170 and commissioned her on 19 August 1918. Relief operated as a salvage and wrecking tug in the New York area while assigned to the 3rd Naval District into 1919. She collided with the patrol vessel  on 27 September 1918; Williams suffered slight damage.

Relief was sold to her former owner on 14 May 1919, and remained in commercial service between the two world wars. During World War II, Relief, although remaining civilian-owned and -operated, supported the U.S. Navy under the direction of its Bureau of Ships beginning on 14 January 1942. Relief subsequently returned to mercantile service until placed out of service in 1955.

Notes

References

Department of the Navy: Naval Historical Center: Online Library of Selected Images: Civilian Ships: Relief (American Salvage Ship, 1907). Served as USS Relief (ID # 2170) in 1918-1919

Tugs of the United States Navy
Ships built by Harlan and Hollingsworth
1907 ships
World War I auxiliary ships of the United States
Maritime incidents in 1918